Juliet Mitchell, Lady Goody  (born 4 October 1940) is a British psychoanalyst, socialist feminist, research professor and author.

Early life and education 
Mitchell was born in Christchurch, New Zealand, in 1940, and then moved to England in 1944, where she stayed with her grandparents in the midlands. 
She attended St Anne's College, Oxford, where she received a degree in English in 1962, as well as doing postgraduate work. 
She taught English literature from 1962 to 1970 at Leeds University and Reading University. Throughout the 1960s, Mitchell was active in leftist politics, and was on the editorial committee of the journal, New Left Review.

Career

Women: The Longest Revolution
Mitchell gained instant media attention with her pathbreaking article "Women: The Longest Revolution", in the New Left Review (1966), an original synthesis of Simone de Beauvoir, Frederich Engels, Viola Klein, Betty Friedan and other analysts of women's oppression.

The Cambridge University Centre for Gender Studies 
She is a fellow professor of Psychoanalysis at the Jesus College, Cambridge and founded the Centre for Gender Studies at Cambridge University. 
In 2010 she was appointed director of the Expanded Doctoral School in Psychoanalytic Studies at the Psychoanalysis Unit of University College London (UCL).

Psychoanalysis and Feminism 

Mitchell is best known for her book Psychoanalysis and Feminism: Freud, Reich, Laing and Women (1974), in which she tried to reconcile psychoanalysis and feminism at a time when many considered them incompatible. Peter Gay considered it "the most rewarding and responsible contribution" to the feminist debate on Freud, both acknowledging and rising beyond Freud's male chauvinism in its analysis. Mitchell saw Freud's asymmetrical view of masculinity and femininity as reflecting the realities of patriarchal culture, and sought to use his critique of femininity to critique patriarchy itself. 

By insisting on the utility of Freud (particularly in a Lacanian reading) for feminism, she opened the way for further critical work on psychoanalysis and gender. She was an Andrew Dickson White Professor-at-Large at Cornell University from 1993 to 1999.

Child-rearing 
A substantial part of the thesis of Psychoanalysis and Feminism is that Marxism provides a model within which non-patriarchal structures for rearing children could occur. 

The lack of the 'family romance' would remove the Oedipus complex from a child's development, thus liberating women from the consequences of penis envy and the feeling of being castrated which Mitchell contends is the root cause of women's acceptance that they are inferior. According to Mitchell, children are socialised into appropriate gender roles, therefore, women grow to be equally socialised into becoming the caretakers of their households.

Feminine sexuality 
In her introduction to Jacques Lacan on feminine sexuality, Mitchell stresses that "in the Freud that Lacan uses, neither the unconscious nor sexuality...[are] pre-given facts, they are constructions; that is, they are objects with histories".

Bibliography

Monographs 
 
 
Reissued as:

Edited books

See also
 Nancy Chodorow
 Kate Millett

References

External links 
 "Women: The Longest Revolution" by Juliet Mitchell (1966)
 Jesus College, University of Cambridge profile
 UCL profile
 Women's Rights: Radical Change – video of Mitchell appearing in a BBC debate first televised in 1974
 A Conversation with Juliet Mitchell
 Interviewed by Alan Macfarlane 6 May 2008  (video)

1940 births
Alumni of St Anne's College, Oxford
British feminists
Fellows of Jesus College, Cambridge
Feminist studies scholars
Feminist psychologists
Living people
British socialist feminists
British psychoanalysts
Academics of the University of Leeds
Academics of the University of Reading
Academics of the University of Cambridge
Academics of University College London
Fellows of the British Academy
New Left
New Zealand emigrants to the United Kingdom
Wives of knights